Sorin Cepoi (born 13 September 1956) is a Romanian gymnast. He competed at the 1976 Summer Olympics and the 1980 Summer Olympics.

References

1956 births
Living people
Romanian male artistic gymnasts
Olympic gymnasts of Romania
Gymnasts at the 1976 Summer Olympics
Gymnasts at the 1980 Summer Olympics
Gymnasts from Bucharest